The Adventures of Robinson Crusoe is a 1922 American adventure film serial directed by Robert F. Hill and based upon the 1719 novel by Daniel Defoe. It is now considered to be a lost film.

Cast
 Harry Myers as Robinson Crusoe
 Noble Johnson as Friday
 Gertrude Olmstead
 Aaron Edwards
 Josef Swickard
 Gertrude Claire
 Emmett King
 Scott Pembroke (credited as Percy Pembroke)

Chapter titles
 The Sea Raiders
 Shipwrecked
 The Cannibals' Captives
 Hidden Gold
 The Ship of Despair
 Friday's Faith
 The Swamp of Terror
 Marooned
 The Jaguar Trap
 A Prisoner of the Sun
 No Greater Love
 The Island of Happiness
 The Sword of Courage
 The Buccaneers
 The Jolly Roger
 The Idol's Bride
 When the Heart Calls
 Back to the Primitive

See also
 List of film serials
 List of film serials by studio

References

External links

1922 films
1922 lost films
1922 adventure films
American silent serial films
American black-and-white films
American adventure films
Films directed by Robert F. Hill
Films based on Robinson Crusoe
Lost American films
Lost adventure films
Universal Pictures film serials
1920s American films
Silent adventure films